Pipa Jing, or Wang Guiren, is a character featured within the classic Chinese novel Fengshen Yanyi (Investiture of the Gods). She is a yaojing (seductive spirit) changed from jade pipa, who later becomes a favorite concubine of King Zhou of Shang.

Character
Pipa Jing is one of three renowned female spectres under the legendary Nüwa.

Encounter
One time, when Pipa Jing returned from a visit with her friend Daji (a malevolent fox spirit), she happens to find Jiang Ziya with a large crowd of people around the fortune telling studio. Thus, Pipa Jing turns herself into a very attractive young woman and approaches Jiang for a fortune divination. 

Unfortunately for Pipa Jing however, Jiang sees that she is truly an evil spectre in disguise; but continues the palm reading. Once Jiang becomes more forceful and will not let go of Pipa Jing's palm, she begins to scream and ask for help from the people around her. Due to this, Jiang had no choice but to smack her over the head with an ink stone – which kills her mortal body. Jiang never let's go of Pipa Jing's palm so that the true spectre cannot escape. Soon enough, Pipa Jing is set in a large amount of firewood and set alight after varied jujus were put in place to prevent her true self from escaping. Once everyone realizes that even her hair never burns or even catches on fire, Pipa Jing ends up being burned to death once Jiang unleashes a triple divine fire combined with shattering lightning. Five years after her death, Pipa Jing is finally be revived once again after her friend Daji gathers the essence of both the moon and the sun.

References 

 Investiture of the Gods chapter 16 – 17

Investiture of the Gods characters
Yaoguai